Helen Moody successfully defended her title, defeating Dorothy Round in the final, 6–4, 6–8, 6–3 to win the ladies' singles tennis title at the 1933 Wimbledon Championships.

Seeds

  Helen Moody (champion)
  Dorothy Round (final)
  Peggy Scriven (quarterfinals)
  Simonne Mathieu (quarterfinals)
  Helen Jacobs (semifinals)
  Hilde Krahwinkel (semifinals)
  Jadwiga Jędrzejowska (third round)
  Lolette Payot (quarterfinals)

Draw

Finals

Top half

Section 1

Section 2

Section 3

Section 4

Bottom half

Section 5

Section 6

Section 7

Section 8

References

External links

Women's Singles
Wimbledon Championship by year – Women's singles
Wimbledon Championships - singles
Wimbledon Championships - singles